This is a list of administrators and governors of Ogun State, Nigeria.
Ogun State was formed on 3 February 1976 when Western State divided into Ogun, Ondo, and Oyo states.

See also
Nigeria
States of Nigeria
List of state governors of Nigeria

References

Ogun
Governors